Sergio Kokis (born May 6, 1944) is a Canadian writer from Quebec. He is a two-time nominee for the Governor General's Award for French-language fiction, for Les amants d'Alfama at the 2004 Governor General's Awards and for Culs-de-sac at the 2013 Governor General's Awards, and won the Prix Molson and the Prix Québec-Paris in 1994 for Le Pavillon des miroirs.

Biography
Born and raised in Brazil, Kokis studied philosophy and psychology, but fled the country after the overthrow of President João Goulart in the 1964 Brazilian coup d'état. He moved to Quebec in 1969, working as a clinical psychologist at various hospitals in Montreal and studying various arts disciplines at the Montreal Museum of Fine Arts' School of Art and Design and the Saidye Bronfman Centre for the Arts.

He published his first novel, Le Pavillon des miroirs, in 1994, and retired from his professional pursuits in 1997 to devote himself exclusively to writing and painting.

As a writer, Kokis has primarily published novels, although he has also published several collections of short stories and a volume of poetry.

Works
Le Pavillon des miroirs (1994)
Negão et Doralice (1995)
Errances (1996)
L'Art du maquillage (1997)
Un Sourire blindé (1998)
La Danse macabre du Québec (1999)
Le Maître de jeu (1999)
Saltimbanques (2000)
Kaléidoscope brisé (2001)
Le Magicien (2002)
Les Amants de l'Alfama (2003)
L'Amour du lointain (2004)
La Gare (2005)
Le Fou de Bosch (2006)
Le Retour de Lorenzo Sanchez (2008)
Dissimulations (2010)
Clandestino (2010)
Amerika (2011)
Culs-de-sac (2013)
Makarius (2014)
Le Sortilège des Chemins (2015)
L’Innocent (2018)
Le Déssinateur (2020)

References

1944 births
Living people
Canadian male novelists
Canadian psychologists
Canadian short story writers in French
20th-century Canadian novelists
21st-century Canadian novelists
20th-century Canadian poets
Canadian male poets
21st-century Canadian poets
20th-century Canadian painters
Canadian male painters
21st-century Canadian painters
Artists from Montreal
Artists from Rio de Janeiro (city)
Writers from Montreal
Writers from Rio de Janeiro (city)
Canadian people of Brazilian descent
Canadian novelists in French
Canadian male short story writers
20th-century Canadian short story writers
21st-century Canadian short story writers
20th-century Canadian male writers
21st-century Canadian male writers
20th-century Canadian male artists
21st-century Canadian male artists